Sansriti is a Bengali theatre group. The group was founded on 9 February 1993.  Debesh Chattopadhyay is a notable member of this group. Notable eminent theatre and film personalities regularly participate in this group's plays.

Productions 
Sansriti has staged several full length and short length plays

Full length plays 
(in alphabetical order)
 Brain
 Bikele Bhorer Shorshe Phool
 Dream Dream
 EA
 Phataru
 Pratinidhi
 Surjo Pora Chai
 Winkle Twinkle
 Prayaschittya
 Shey
 Tughlaq
 Jatugriha

Short length plays 
 Break Fail
 Cadaverous
 Kanu Kahe Rai
 Shyama Sundari
 Tetri Kahini
 Maow
 Siddhidata

References

External links 
 

Bengali theatre groups
Theatre companies in India
Performing groups established in 1993
1993 establishments in West Bengal